A piston is an engineering component of engines and pumps.

Piston(s) may also refer to:

Science and technology
 Piston (optics)
 Piston (subcellular structure)
 Piston valve
 Fire piston, an ancient device for kindling fire
 Gas-operated reloading, sometimes referred to as a gas piston.
 Piston, the working name for the Steam Machine gaming platform

People and groups
 Pist.On, an American heavy metal band
 Detroit Pistons, an American basketball team
 Steinbach Pistons, a Canadian ice hockey team
 Walter Piston, an American composer
 Web Piston, a software and web hosting company

Other 
 Piston (music), a type of oboe
 Piston controls the combination action on a pipe organ